Inauguration of Ronald Reagan may refer to: 

First inauguration of Ronald Reagan, 1981
Second inauguration of Ronald Reagan, 1985

See also